Aix is a commune in the Corrèze department in the Nouvelle-Aquitaine region of central France.

The inhabitants of the commune are known as Aixois or Aixoises

Geography
Aix is located some 50 km south-west of Clermont-Ferrand.  The south eastern section of the commune is traversed by the TransEuroppienne Motorway (E70 / A89).  Exit No. 24 is just next to the border and this exit to the north connects the motorway to the Highway D1089 which runs fairly parallel to the motorway from Ussel in the south-west to Merlines in the north-east passing through the heart of the commune. To reach the village of Aix it is possible to take the D40E2 which branches from the D1089 south-west of the commune and goes directly to the town. The town can also be accessed from the west on the D49 from Saint-Pardoux-le-Vieux which, after passing through the town, continues east to link with the D1089. There is also Highway D91 from the north as well as many small country roads.

To the south-east of the town about 1.5 km in a direct line is the railway station of La Marsalouse which is served by TER Limousin and TER Auvergne trains which link Clermont-Ferrand to Gare de Limoges-Bénédictins and Gare de Brive-la-Gaillarde. TER buses also connect Aix and La Marsalouse to Ussel and Montluçon town, this route having been transferred to the road on 29 February 2008. There are many forests covering the commune with approximately 50% forest and 50% farmland.

The commune is covered by numerous streams including the Dozanne, the Sarsonne, the Dognon, the Jaloustre, the Barricade, and many others. Most of these flow into the Chavanon river which forms the border between the Correze and Puy-de-Dome departments in the south-east.

Neighbouring communes and towns

Heraldry

Administration

List of Successive Mayors of Aix

Population

Culture and heritage

Civil heritage
The commune has a number of buildings and structures that are registered as historical monuments:
The War Memorial (1921)
The Inn (1821)
A Farmhouse at La Sauvette (18th century)
A Farmhouse at La Navade (1866)
A Farmhouse at Encogneras (1747)
A Farmhouse / Mill at La Chassagnite (18th century), one of the few water mills in running condition.
Farmhouses (17th-19th century)

Other sites of interest
The Lyon-Bordeaux Roman Road visible between La Chassagnite and Aix railway station.
A Feudal mound east of the town.
Beautiful views of the Puy de Dome and Dore mountains (at the end of the village to the north on the D49).
Hiking: the mail carrier path of 17 km with the departure point marked at the town hall. The Circuit de la Chassagnite (panel 13) of 13 km follows the Roman road. The Circuit Chamina 42 Roman road is 6 km with intermittent yellow signs.
Mountain bike trail

Religious heritage
The commune has several religious buildings and structures that are registered as historical monuments:

A Cemetery Cross (1888)
A Cemetery (1888). The movable items in the cemetery have been registered as historical objects.
The Parish Church of Saint Martin-de-Tours (13th century). The Church contains many items that are registered as historical objects:
2 Bronze Bells (1871)
A Painting with frame: Calvary with Saint Madeleine (17th century)
A Sunburst Monstrance (19th century)
A Neo-gothic Chalice with Paten (19th century)
A Neo-gothic Chalice with Paten (19th century)
A Reliquary Cross (19th century)
A Sacristy Cross (17th century)
A Painting: The Calvary (17th century)
A Statue: Saint Martin-de-Tours (18th century)
A Statue: Virgin and child (18th century)
A Confessional (18th century)
2 Statues: Saint Gervais and Saint Protais (17th century)
A Retable (17th century)
A Stained glass window: Virgin of the Nativity and Christ of the Eucharist (1891)
The Furniture in the Church

See also
Communes of the Corrèze department

References

External links
Aix on the National Geographic Institute website 
Aix on Géoportail, National Geographic Institute (IGN) website 
Aix on the 1750 Cassini Map

Communes of Corrèze